Chartrand et Simonne is a French-Canadian biographical drama television mini-series about social activists Michel Chartrand and Simonne Monet. The series lasted for a total of twelve episodes, with the first six airing in 2000 on Radio-Canada and the remaining six in 2003 on Télé-Québec (re-titled as Simonne et Chartrand). The series was directed by Alain Chartrand, one of the couple's sons.

Plot
The series recounts the life of Michel Chartrand and Simonne Monet, a couple who fought for social change and justice. We witness the battles they face all the while trying to raise a family. From the moment they first meet to Monet's death, decades of activism is outlined, all of which had a significant impact on Quebec society.

Main cast
 Luc Picard as Michel Chartrand
 Geneviève Rioux as Simonne Monet-Chartrand
 Raymond Bouchard as Amédée Monet
 Muriel Dutil as Berthe Monet
 Marie-Lyse Laberge-Forest as Marie Chartrand
 Guillaume Legault as Alain Chartrand 
 Normand Bissonnette as Émile Boudreau
 Gabriel Gascon as Louis Chartrand
 Valérie Gervais-Lillo as Madeleine Chartrand
 Karine Poulin as Hélène Chartrand
 Eric Paulhus as Dominique Chartrand 
 Annie Charland as Micheline Chartrand 
 Françoise Graton as Hélène Patenaude-Chartrand
 Stéphane Demers as Pierre Trudeau
 Patrick Goyette as Gérard Pelletier

Awards
The series won six awards at the 2000 Prix Gémeaux: Best Dramatic Series, Best Direction in a Dramatic Series, Best Lead Actor in a Dramatic Series, Best Set Design, Best Make-up/Hair and Best Costume Design. For its second installment, at the 2004 Prix Gémeaux, Luc Picard again won the award for Best Lead Actor in a Dramatic Series, while Geneviève Rioux won the award for Best Lead Actress in a Dramatic Series.

References

External links
 

2000s Canadian drama television series
2000s Canadian television miniseries
Television shows filmed in Quebec
Ici Radio-Canada Télé original programming
Canadian political drama television series
Télé-Québec original programming